Syed Hamzah Shah Bukhari (born December 31, 1993 in Lahore) is a professional squash player who represented Pakistan. He reached a career-high world ranking of World No. 158 in June 2013.

References

External links

1993 births
Living people
Pakistani male squash players
21st-century Pakistani people